Thunder Island is a 1921 American silent adventure film directed by Norman Dawn and starring Edith Roberts, John B. O'Brien and Arthur Jasmine.

Cast
Edith Roberts as Isola Garcia / Juan Garcia
Fred DeSilva as Pia Mendoza
John B. O'Brien as Paul Corbin 
Arthur Jasmine as Sanchez the Loco
Fred Kohler as Barney the Mate

References

Bibliography

External links

1921 adventure films
American silent feature films
American adventure films
Films directed by Norman Dawn
American black-and-white films
Universal Pictures films
1920s English-language films
1920s American films
Silent adventure films